Bonavista Bay (BB) is a large bay located on the northeast coast of the island of Newfoundland in the province of Newfoundland and Labrador in Canada. It opens directly onto the Atlantic Ocean.

The bay is demarcated by Cape Freels to the north and Cape Bonavista to the south. Cape Bonavista is also the eastern limit of the Bonavista Peninsula, which forms the bay's southern shore. The topography of the central western shore of the bay is composed of numerous channels and islands. This area also hosts Terra Nova National Park.

Containing many densely forested islands, Bonavista Bay is virtually landlocked. With temperatures sometimes reaching -1 °C, it attracts the occasional iceberg. However, due to the dense forestry, the region inside the bay can sometimes be warm enough for lobster cultivation.

The smaller communities in Newfoundland may often be referenced by the Bay in which they are located, e.g.: 'Wesleyville, BB'.

Fishing communities 
 Newtown
 Wesleyville
 Badger's Quay
 Valleyfield
 North West Arm
 Centreville
 Trinity
 Dover
 Hare Bay
 Gambo
 Glovertown
 Eastport
 Port Blandford
 Musgravetown
 Summerville
 Bonavista

The bay has a small ferry operated by the provincial government providing service from Burnside to St. Brendan's on Cottel's Island.

References 

Bays of Newfoundland and Labrador